The 2014 ICC Awards followed the same formal event which was implemented in 2013 as a TV show. The voting panel took into account players' performance between 26 August 2013 and 17 September 2014. The show was broadcast globally on 15–16 November. The ICC awards the Sir Garfield Sobers Trophy to the Cricketer of the Year, which is considered to be the most prestigious award in world cricket.

Award categories and winners

Individual awards

Men's awards

Women's awards

Other awards

ICC Teams of the Year

ICC Men's Test Team of the Year

Angelo Mathews was selected as the captain of the Test Team of the Year, with AB de Villiers selected as the wicket-keeper, Other players are:

 David Warner
 Kane Williamson
 Kumar Sangakkara
 AB de Villiers
 Joe Root
 Angelo Mathews
 Mitchell Johnson
 Stuart Broad
 Dale Steyn
 Rangana Herath
 Tim Southee
 Ross Taylor (12th man)

ICC Men's ODI Team of the Year

For the fourth time in a row, MS Dhoni was selected as both captain and wicket-keeper of the ODI Team of the Year. Other players are:

 Mohammad Hafeez
 Quinton de Kock
 Virat Kohli
 George Bailey
 AB de Villiers
 MS Dhoni
 Dwayne Bravo
 James Faulkner
 Dale Steyn
 Mohammed Shami
 Ajantha Mendis
 Rohit Sharma (12th man)

Selection Committee
Chaired by ICC Cricket Hall of Famer Anil Kumble, the ICC Selection Committee provided a long list of nominations to the 32 members of the voting academy to cast their votes in the individual player award categories. They also selected the ICC World XI Teams.

Selection Committee members:

 Anil Kumble (chairman)
 Jonathan Agnew
 Russel Arnold
 Stephen Fleming
 Betty Timmer

See also

 International Cricket Council
 ICC Awards
 Sir Garfield Sobers Trophy (Cricketer of the Year)
 ICC Test Player of the Year
 ICC ODI Player of the Year
 David Shepherd Trophy (Umpire of the Year)
 ICC Women's Cricketer of the Year
 ICC Test Team of the Year
 ICC ODI Team of the Year

References

International Cricket Council awards and rankings
Crick
ICC Awards